America Betrayed is a 2008 American documentary political film directed by Leslie Carde and featuring President Barack Obama, Senators John McCain and Mary Landrieu.

Cast

References

External links
 
 

Documentary films about American politicians
2008 documentary films
2008 films
2000s political films
First Run Features films
2000s American films